Good Ba Ba (foaled 2002) is a Hong Kong based Thoroughbred racehorse. In the season of 2007-2008, Good Ba Ba had five consecutive wins in Hong Kong G1 and G2 races. He was voted Hong Kong Horse of the Year.

On December 14, 2008 Good Ba Ba won his second consecutive Hong Kong Mile, setting a new Shatin Racecourse course record time.

References
 Good Ba Ba's pedigree and partial racing stats at Pedigree Query
  Profile of Good Ba Ba 
 The Hong Kong Jockey Club – Good Ba Ba Racing Record 
 The Hong Kong Jockey Club

2002 racehorse births
Thoroughbred family 28
Racehorses bred in Kentucky
Racehorses trained in Hong Kong